Ahmadabad-e Yek may refer to:
 Ahmadabad-e Yek, Chatrud, Kerman County, Kerman Province